Narnavirus is a genus of positive-strand RNA viruses in the family Narnaviridae. Fungi serve as natural hosts. There are two species in this genus. Member viruses have been shown to be required for sexual reproduction of Rhizopus microsporus. Narnaviruses have a naked RNA genome without a virion and derive their name from this feature.

Virology

Structure
Narnaviruses have no true virion. They do not have structural proteins or a capsid.

Genome 
Narnaviruses have nonsegmented, linear, positive-sense, single-stranded RNA genomes. The genome has one open reading frame which encodes the RNA-dependent RNA polymerase (RdRp). The genome is associated with the RdRp in the cytoplasm of the fungi host and forms a naked ribonucleoprotein complex.

Replication cycle
Viral replication is cytoplasmic. Replication follows the positive-strand RNA virus replication model. Positive-strand RNA virus transcription is the method of transcription. The virus exits the host cell by cell-to-cell movement. Fungi serve as the natural host. Transmission routes are parental and sexual.

Taxonomy 

The genus has the following two species:
 Saccharomyces 20S RNA narnavirus
 Saccharomyces 23S RNA narnavirus

References

External links
 Viralzone: Narnavirus
 ICTV

Narnaviridae
Virus genera
Mycoviruses